Shahpur Mosque, also known as Shahpur Paththarwali Masjid or Kazi Mohammed Chishti's Mosque, is a medieval mosque  located near Shahpur Gate in Ahmedabad, India.

Shahpur mosque was built in 1565, by Shaikh Husain Muhammad Chishti (d.1574) of Shahpur Qazi religious order. It was never finished. The dimensions are fifty-nine feet long by thirty-eight feet broad. The body, simple and graceful, arched in the under story, and except the central window flat in the upper, is an attempt to combine the pillared and arched styles. The minarets, perhaps in too great contrast to the plainness of the body of the building, are for richness of ornament and delicacy of tracery equal to any mosque in Ahmedabad. The central dome positioned on second floor is supported by twelve pillars. There are forty-four more pillars which support the roof and arches in the façade.

Gallery

References 

 This article includes public domain text from 

Mosques in Ahmedabad
Religious buildings and structures completed in 1565
Monuments of National Importance in Gujarat